I'm Already Home is the debut studio album by Australian rock band Waikiki, released on 29 September 2002.  The album reached number 43 on the ARIA Albums Chart.

Track listing 
 "New Technology"
 "Lucky"
 "Did I?"
 "Falling"
 "Ms Universe"
 "Here Comes September"
 "Complicated"
 "Enough"
 "A Drunken Laugh"
 "Beautiful Picture"
 "I'm Already Home"

Charts

See also

References 

2002 debut albums